Namam may refer to:

Sricharanam, identification mark of Sri Vaishnavites and Iyengars
Thirunamam, identification mark used by Ayyavali